The 1917 Carlisle Indians football team represented the Carlisle Indian Industrial School as an independent during the 1917 college football season. Led by Deed Harris in his first and only season as head coach, the Indians compiled a record of 3–6.

Schedule

References

Carlisle
Carlisle Indians football seasons
Carlisle Indians football